Nikola Simić (born 21 December 1996) is a Serbian professional footballer who plays as a goalkeeper for Vojvodina.

Club career

Vojvodina
On 18 July 2018 Simić signed a three-year-deal with Vojvodina. He had his debut for the club on 2 September 2018, replacing Emil Rockov in 32nd minute of 4:1 home defeat against Red Star Belgrade.

Career statistics

Honours
Vojvodina
Serbian Cup: 2019–20

References

External links
 
 

1996 births
Living people
Footballers from Belgrade
Serbian footballers
Association football goalkeepers
FK Bežanija players
FK Srem Jakovo players
FK Sinđelić Beograd players
FK Vojvodina players
Serbian First League players
Serbian SuperLiga players